The Gediz River is the second-longest river in Anatolia flowing into the Aegean Sea.

Name
The ancient Greek name of the river was Hermos (Ἕρμος), Latinized as Hermus.

The name of the river Gediz may be related to the Lydian proper name Cadys; Gediz is also the name of a town near the river's sources. The name "Gediz" may also be encountered as a male given name in Turkey.

Ancient geography

The Gediz is one of the two candidates for the Hittite placename Seha River, the other being the Bakırçay.

The Hermos separated Aeolia from Ionia, except for Ionic Phocaea, which was north of the Hermos. The valley of the Hermos was the heartland of the ancient Lydian Empire and overlooking the valley was the Lydian capital Sardis.

Location
In Turkey's Aegean Region, Gediz River's length is second only to Büyük Menderes River whose flow is roughly parallel at a distance of slightly more than a hundred kilometers to the south.

Gediz River rises from Murat Mountain and Şaphane Mountain in Kütahya Province and flows through Uşak, Manisa and İzmir Provinces. It joins the sea in the northern section of the Gulf of İzmir, close to the gulf's mouth, near the village of Yenibağarası in Foça district, south of the center of the district.

The Gediz Basin lies between northern latitudes of 38004’–39013’ and southern longitudes of 26042’–29045’. It covers 2.2% of the total area of Turkey. Larger part of the alluvial plain called under the same name as the river (Gediz Plain) is within the area of Manisa Province and a smaller downstream section within İzmir Province.

Environmental issues
The Gediz Delta is important as a nature reserve and is home to rare bird species. However, the reserve suffers from water shortages due to heavy demands from irrigation projects, connected to the Demirköprü Dam.

High level of urbanization and industrialization along its basin have caused the Gediz River to suffer severe pollution, particularly by sand and gravel quarries and leather industry. These factors contributed to the river's formerly rich fish reserves to become a thing of the past in recent years.

See also

 Battle of the Gediz, near the river, during the Turkish War of Independence
 Gediz (town)
 Hermus (mythology)

References

Rivers of Turkey
Landforms of Kütahya Province
Landforms of Uşak Province
Landforms of Manisa Province
Landforms of İzmir Province